Henry Henshaw was an Oxford college head in the 16th-century.

Henshaw graduated BA in 1543, MA in 1546 and BD in 1557. He was Rector of Lincoln College, Oxford, from 1558 until 1560.

References

Alumni of Magdalen College, Oxford
Rectors of Lincoln College, Oxford
16th-century English people